"On the Pathos of Truth" (German: Über das Pathos der Wahrheit) is a short essay by Friedrich Nietzsche concerning the motivation of philosophers to seek knowledge as an end in itself.  Nietzsche identifies this motivation with pride.  On this point the essay prefigures theories concerning a destructive "will to truth" that Nietzsche discusses in On the Genealogy of Morals, Beyond Good and Evil, and The Gay Science.

As an illustration of a motivated seeker of truth, Nietzsche takes Heraclitus, although he also discusses Pythagoras and Empedocles.  He recounts Heraclitus as being psychologically distant from other people, due to being aware of truth while others are not: 

Nietzsche's focus is on the psychology and social life of the philosopher, identifying misanthropy and seclusion as the result of being motivated toward knowledge itself, regardless of any features of the philosopher's cosmology, physics, or epistemology.

Nietzsche concludes the essay by identifying a need to have art along with knowledge.   Art is necessary because it adds emotion and [[[Purpose of life|purpose]] to society. Knowledge is limited; for example, a knowledge of matter and motion will not reveal any purpose in the universe.  While the motivation for knowledge in itself brings about insights which help society, art allows constant variation which can affirm a sense a purposiveness, which is an emotional need of individuals.

"On the Pathos of Truth" was written in 1872, and was intended to be a preface or foreword, but no book was ever written to follow it.  Nietzsche, however, did collect it, along with four other such prefaces to unwritten books, and gave the edition to Cosima Wagner as a Christmas present.

Notes

External links
“About Truth and lie in the extra-moral sense”. pages 119-128. In: Nietzsche’s seven notebooks from 1876.  by Daniel Fidel Ferrer, 2020. Free online translation. 

Essays by Friedrich Nietzsche
Metaphilosophy
Philosophy essays
1872 essays